Landry Allbright (born August 1, 1989) is an American actress known for working as a child in hit films and television shows. Allbright is best known for playing Bridget in The Bold and the Beautiful (1996–1997).

Filmography

Film

Television

References

1989 births
Living people
American actresses
21st-century American women